Roknäs is a locality or village is a situated in Piteå Municipality, Norrbotten County, Sweden with 1,238 inhabitants in 2010. There is a school, a library, a restaurant and a football field in the village. The distanse to Piteå is about 10 kilometres, where there are many shops, restaurants and general city life.

References 

Populated places in Piteå Municipality
Norrbotten